Manuel de Herrera (1635 – January 31, 1689) was a Roman Catholic prelate who served as Bishop of Durango (1686–1689).

Biography
Manuel de Herrera was born in Salamanca, Spain and ordained a priest in the Order of Friars Minor.
On March 14, 1686, he was selected by the King of Spain and confirmed on May 13, 1686, by Pope Innocent XI as Bishop of Durango. 
He served as Bishop of Durango until his death on January 31, 1689.

References

External links and additional sources
 (for Chronology of Bishops) 
 (for Chronology of Bishops) 

1635 births
1689 deaths
People from Salamanca
Bishops appointed by Pope Innocent XI
Franciscan bishops